Joseph George Marconi (February 6, 1934 – August 23, 1992) was an American football fullback who played professionally for the Los Angeles Rams and Chicago Bears in the National Football League (NFL).

Marconi was born in the Pittsburgh area city of Fredericktown, Pennsylvania. He played football in high school and was offered an athletic scholarship at the University of Maryland, but he didn't like the school and found himself at West Virginia University.

He was first used on defense, but was found to be too productive on offense in the running game and was part of the backfield. As a running back, he piled up 998 career yards on 181 carries for an impressive 5.5 average and 18 touchdowns.

Marconi helped West Virginia to a 31–7 record during his four-year tenure. He was selected to play in the College Football All-Star Game and the Blue–Gray Football Classic after his senior season and he ended up being the Los Angeles Rams first pick in the 1956 draft. He accumulated impressive yardage as a Ram with 1,769 yards and 21 touchdowns. He was traded to the Bears before the 1962 season.

He played five years with the Bears organization and was elected to the Pro Bowl in 1964. In 1966, he retired from football to become a sales representative in the steel business. He died in Downers Grove, Illinois, his home.

References

1934 births
1992 deaths
American football fullbacks
Chicago Bears players
Los Angeles Rams players
West Virginia Mountaineers football players
Western Conference Pro Bowl players
People from Washington County, Pennsylvania
Players of American football from Pennsylvania